Barbara Freyberg, Baroness Freyberg, GBE, DStJ (born Barbara Jekyll and known as Barbara McLaren during her first marriage; 14 June 1887 – 24 September 1973) was a British peeress.

Family

Born as Barbara Jekyll, she was a daughter of Colonel Sir Herbert Jekyll, KCMG and his wife, Dame Agnes Graham Jekyll, DBE. On 20 July 1911, she married Hon. Francis Walter Stafford McLaren, the-then Liberal MP for Spalding and the second son of the 1st Baron Aberconway. They had two sons, Major Martin John McLaren (11 January 1914 – 27 July 1979) and Guy Lewis Ian McLaren (8 November 1915 – 18 August 1978). Francis, a Royal Flying Corps officer and the Member of Parliament for Spalding in Lincolnshire, was killed in a flying accident 1917. As a result, and out of a desire to retain her connection with the town, Barbara was instrumental in the construction of Spalding War Memorial. She commissioned Sir Edwin Lutyens through her aunt, Gertrude Jekyll—a friend and collaborator of Lutyens. She donated £1,000 towards the cost of the memorial and attended the unveiling ceremony on 9 June 1922.

On 14 June 1922 Barbara married her second husband, Bernard Cyril Freyberg (later Baron Freyberg), at St. Martha-on-the-Hill, near Guildford, Surrey. They had one son: Paul Richard Freyberg, 2nd Baron Freyberg (27 May 1923  – 26 May 1993).

WWII
During World War II, she was a welfare worker in Cairo, was mentioned in despatches and awarded an OBE in 1943. When her husband's term as Governor-General of New Zealand ended in 1952, Lady Freyberg was awarded the GBE in the 1953 New Year Honours.

Death

She died in 1973 at 65 Chelsea Square, London SW3. She was interred in the churchyard of Saint Martha on the Hill in Guildford, Surrey, alongside her second husband (and later her son).

References

Links
 Profile, thepeerage.com; accessed 23 March 2014.

1887 births
1973 deaths
British baronesses
Dames Grand Cross of the Order of the British Empire
Dames of Grace of the Order of St John
McLaren family
People from Surrey
Spouses of New Zealand Governors-General
Wives of knights